Keene Valley Library is a historic library building located at Keene Valley in Essex County, New York.  The original building was built in 1896, with additions completed in 1923, 1931, 1962, and 1985.  The original main block is a one-story timber frame structure on a random ashlar foundation. The building exhibits features of the Shingle Style and Adirondack Architecture.

It was listed on the National Register of Historic Places in 2000.

References

Library buildings completed in 1896
Libraries on the National Register of Historic Places in New York (state)
Shingle Style architecture in New York (state)
Buildings and structures in Essex County, New York
National Register of Historic Places in Essex County, New York